Krasnaya Yaruga is an urban-type settlement in Belgorod Oblast in Russia. Population:

Geography

History
The town was first mentioned in 1681. In 1874, a well-known industrialist IG Kharitonenko built a sugar factory in the town. Status of urban-type settlement was granted in 1958. The village is the birthplace of the Hero of the Soviet Union Grigory Tkachenko.

References

Cities and towns in Belgorod Oblast
Populated places in Krasnoyaruzhsky District
Grayvoronsky Uyezd